Lock and Load or Lock 'N Load may refer to:

Games 
Lock 'n Load (tabletop game)
Lock & Load: Character Primer for Iron Kingdoms
Lock 'n Load Publishing, of board and computer games

Music 
Lock 'n Load (album), a comedy album by Denis Leary
Lock 'n' Load (duo), a Dutch music duo who had a number one UK Independent Single in 2000
T·O·S (Terminate on Sight) or Lock and Load, an album by G-Unit
Lock & Load, an album by Leslie Fish
"Lock and Load", a song by Bob Seger from It's a Mystery
"Lock and Load", a song by Lil Wayne from Tha Carter II
"Lock and Load", a song by The Mess Hall from Feeling Sideways
"Lock and Load", a song by Snapper from A.D.M. 
"Lock & Load", a song by Bone Crusher from AttenCHUN!
"Lock-n-Load", a song by Layzie Bone from Thug by Nature
"Lock and Load" a song on the Devil May Cry Original Soundtrack

Television 
Lock 'N Load (TV series), about gun enthusiasts
Lock N' Load with R. Lee Ermey, about weapon history 
"Lock & Load", a 2006 episode of The Colbert Report
"Lock and Load, Babe", an episode of Vanishing Son